Chipstead is a predominantly commuter village in north-east Surrey, England, that has been a small ecclesiastical parish since the Domesday Survey of 1086.  Its rolling landscape meant that Chipstead's development was late and restricted compared to parishes of comparable distance from London. Formerly and formally including Hooley and Netherne-on-the-Hill, on census day, 1831 Chipstead had 66 homes. Today, excluding those two parts, the village has 1,212 homes spread across the slopes and crests of a northern section of the North Downs. Parts of the village are in or adjoin the Surrey Hills AONB.

Geography
The land within and to all sides forms curved valleys of downland.  Beyond Chipstead's boundaries are the villages of Woodmansterne and slightly more distant Coulsdon, Banstead, Hooley and Kingswood.  Woodmansterne is in two parts, one of which is in Greater London (as is Coulsdon) – the nearest, the Surrey part is the western follow-on to the built-up valley street of Chipstead.  Housing and parks span the east slopes of a narrow valley known as Chipstead Valley or Chipstead Bottom which is a dry valley.  This has some subterranean flows common in the chalk hills of the North Downs, a long hill range south of Woking, Croydon and the Thames Estuary.

Conservation
The residents of Chipstead have prevented installation of street lighting, particularly in the southern parts of the village.  Two residents associations exist, both founded in the 20th century.  One caters broadly for all parts from Chipstead Valley to Hooley, while the second concentrates on architectural beauty and views from public places in areas where these may be at risk. Identified as among Chipstead's characteristics are its mature trees, hedgerows, rural wildlife and dark skies at night:

Chipstead Downs is a Site of Special Scientific Interest (SSSI). To the north-west of the village is Banstead Heath, a rolling plateau of open common land. This area is maintained by the Banstead Commons Conservators.

Today Chipstead does not have a clearly defined village centre; instead there are several small areas of economic activity in a largely residential area.

The village is home to many societies, some of which are linked to the church.  Another focal point of the village is a small parade of shops, near to the railway station.

History
The village lay within the Reigate hundred.

Chipstead appears in Domesday Book as Tepestede. It was held by William de Wateville. Its Domesday assets were: 3 hides; 7 ploughs, 1 mill worth £1, woodland worth 5 hogs. It rendered £8.

The Grade I listed church of St Margaret is in Hooley, the official hamlet of the village, with somewhat isolated geography and its own article.  It was restored in 1827 when its patron was the Jolliffe family of Chipstead Court keeping its 12th century arch and foundations. The school in the Victorian era here was endowed by Mary Stephens in 1746 with land producing £70 per annum. Sir Edward Banks (builder) enterprising building contractor for public works, was in 1835 buried in the churchyard – his business partner and daughter's husband being the patrons of the church and owners of Chipstead Court since 1788.

From 1894 until 1934 Chipstead was part of Reigate Rural District.

Demography
The current three-member electoral ward Chipstead, Hooley and Woodmansterne had a population of 6,912 as at the United Kingdom 2011 Census.

The census areas which Chipstead occupied were drawn as Reigate and Banstead 004C and 004D.  As such, Chipstead has 7.4% of the borough's area and has 2.3% of borough's population.  Less than a third of the borough's own proportion of dwelling types, 8% of Chipstead homes were flats or apartments.  In total 380 Chipstead residents, 24% of the population in 2011, were retired.  Further common comparators for places in the United Kingdom are as shown below.

Sport and leisure
Within the vicinity of Chipstead, there are several sports clubs, many taking the Chipstead name.
Chipstead F.C. a Non-League football club has a minor claim to fame as some of Footballers' Wives was filmed here. 
 Chipstead Rugby Football Club. They play in Surrey League 1 and were founded in 1959.

Transport
Chipstead railway station is on the Tattenham Corner Line.

There are no bus services through the village – route 166, run by Arriva London for London Buses, passes its suburban northern edge to serve neighbouring Woodmansterne.  Route 405 passes through Hooley, a short walk from the church. Other services are at Banstead and Coulsdon.

Notable persons

Actress June Brown lived in Chipstead.
The poet Catherine Maria Fanshawe (1765–1834) was born at Shabden in Chipstead.
Professional golfer Charles Mayo lived there in 1906.
Former footballer Danny Murphy and his actress wife Joanna Taylor are residents of Chipstead.
Singer-songwriter David Wiffen spent his early childhood in Chipstead.
Mark Serwotka, General Secretary of the Public and Commercial Services Union, lives in Chipstead.

See also
List of places of worship in Reigate and Banstead

References

External links

Villages in Surrey
Reigate and Banstead